Thomas Edward Fletcher is a fictional character from the Australian soap opera Home and Away, played by actor Roger Oakley. He made his first screen appearance in the pilot episode broadcast on 17 January 1988. The character departed on 30 April 1990, but reappeared briefly in 2008 as a ghost in Sally Fletcher's near-death experience following her second stabbing.

Development
The character of Tom was conceived by the creator and then executive producer of Home and Away Alan Bateman. New Zealand actor Roger Oakley was cast in the role and Bateman commented "He is so good on the screen, when people see him they will be asking where he has been all their lives." Oakley had appeared in various dramas, including The Sullivans, and a few films, but appearing in Home and Away was the longest he had worked "in one stretch". He considered it to be his breakout role, saying "It shows that it can happen to anyone. I feel also that, in a sense, it's my turn. I've served my time."

Storylines
Tom originally lived in the city with his wife, Pippa (Vanessa Downing; Debra Lawrence). As Pippa had rheumatic fever as a child her heart had been weakened, and had been warned that if she fell pregnant there was a good chance the strain would kill her. Tom had a vasectomy to stop her from falling pregnant, but the two were desperate to become parents and decided to start fostering. They receive their first charge in 1978 in the form of an eight-year-old tearaway named Frank Morgan (Alex Papps), whose parents Les (Mario Kery) and Helena (Lee Sanderson) are a criminal and an alcoholic, respectively. Mr. Jarvis (John Stone) of the Department of Child Services warns Frank is difficult but the Fletchers are able to provide a stable home for him. Ten years later, Frank is still living with the Fletchers and they have since taken on four more children; Carly Morris (Sharyn Hodgson); Steven Matheson (Adam Willits); Lynn Davenport (Helena Bozich); and Sally Keating (Kate Ritchie). Following Tom's 40th birthday, his boss informs him he has been retrenched. Jarvis worries about the children's welfare but the Fletchers are determined not to lose them so they sell the house, pack up and move to the coastal town of Summer Bay.

Shortly after the Fletchers arrive, Tom and Pippa purchase Summer Bay House and the Caravan Park from Alf Stewart (Ray Meagher), who had lived there with his late wife, Martha (Alison Mulvaney), and their daughter, Roo  (Justine Clarke). They quickly make friends in the community including park tenants Floss (Sheila Kennelly) and Neville McPhee (Frank Lloyd) and local shopkeeper Ailsa Hogan (Judy Nunn). Tom makes an enemy of neighbour Donald Fisher (Norman Coburn) after he and Pippa foster local tearaway Bobby Simpson (Nicolle Dickson). Fisher sets about making life difficult for Tom, who struggles find to work. Tom has a small stroke of luck when Mervin Baldivis (Peter Boswell) is able to put a good work in for him working on the road gang for Sam Barlow (Jeff Truman). Tom and Barlow butt heads when Barlow makes an off-hand remark about Carly's recent rape trauma leading to a fight at work and Tom quits after. However, Tom is promoted to foreman and Barlow is demoted to waste detail.

After Carly's embarrassment over Tom's job, he feels hurt. However the Macklin family open the Sands Resort and Tom takes a job there. Further good news arrives when Pippa learns she is pregnant despite Tom's vasectomy. The couple worry Pippa may die during childbirth but decide to take risk. Pippa is healthy and they celebrate the birth of their newborn son, Christopher (Ashleigh Bell-Weir). Work soon begins to take its toll on Tom and he collapses following a stroke and is hospitalised for a number of weeks. Following his recovery, Tom and Pippa's marriage faces a testing time in the next year when Zac Burgess (Mark Conroy) a shark hunter makes a play for Pippa and rumours of an affair are spread around. However, Zac is driven out of town after his behaviour is exposed and Tom and Pippa reconcile. While driving back from a football game with Bobby, Steven and Sophie Simpson (Rebekah Elmaloglou), Tom suffers a second stroke and crashes the car. Paramedics try to revive him but Tom dies, leaving the family devastated.

18 years later, Tom reappears as a vision to Sally when she suffers a near-death experience after a second stabbing at the hands of Johnny Cooper (Callan Mulvey). He shows Sally a vision of the Bay if she dies and an alternate reality where her long-lost twin brother Miles Copeland (Josh Quong Tart) is murdered by Johnny instead. Tom also shows Sally a glimpse into future which reveals Cassie Turner (Sharni Vinson) has contracted HIV and tells if she does return someone else will die. This is prophetic as Sally's friend Dan Baker (Tim Campbell) dies shortly after. When Sally recovers, she tells Pippa about the vision and she is sceptical, but she still somewhat believes her. Alf also believes her, as he had been through a similar experience when he saw visions of Ailsa after her death during a brain tumour he was suffering from.

Reception
Robin Oliver of The Sydney Morning Herald thought Oakley and Downing played Tom and Pippa with "honest-to-goodness down-home charm". Oliver's colleague Morris Gleitzman observed that Tom and Pippa were "the sort of parents we'd all like to be" and thought the family were warm and cheerful. He called Tom "a remarkable bloke" for facing his 40th birthday, retrenchment and relocation to Summer Bay with confidence and only minor issues. Ruth Deller of television website Lowculture said "One of the nicest dad characters in soap, ever, has to be Tom Fletcher from Home and Away". The Soap Show called Tom the "first patriarch of Home and Away."

References

Home and Away characters
Fictional Vietnam War veterans
Television characters introduced in 1988
Fictional foster carers
Male characters in television